<noinclude>
The 2018 NFC Championship Game was a National Football League (NFL) game played on January 20, 2019, to determine the National Football Conference (NFC) champion for the 2018 NFL season. The visiting Los Angeles Rams defeated the New Orleans Saints 26–23 in sudden death overtime to advance to their first Super Bowl since the 2001 season. The outcome, however, was mired in controversy because of unpenalized pass interference committed by Rams cornerback Nickell Robey-Coleman on Saints wide receiver Tommylee Lewis near the end of regulation, which would be nicknamed the "NOLA No-Call".

The Saints entered the game slightly favored to win, due to being the NFC's top seed, having homefield advantage at the Mercedes-Benz Superdome, and previously defeating the Rams in the regular season. Both finished the regular season with a 13–3 record, with the Saints owning the tiebreaker from their prior win over the Rams. In a tight contest that was tied at 20 by the fourth quarter, the Saints reached the Rams' 13-yard line while less than two minutes remained, but the uncalled pass interference caused their drive to stall. Had the penalty been called, the Saints could have run out the clock further and/or scored a go-ahead touchdown to virtually seal their victory. Instead, the Saints settled for a field goal with 1:41 remaining, which the Rams matched on their next possession to force overtime. The Saints took possession first in overtime from winning the coin toss, but an interception from Saints quarterback Drew Brees led to Rams kicker Greg Zuerlein scoring the winning field goal.

The no-call was met with backlash, particularly in New Orleans where Saints fans attempted to have the game replayed and boycotted the season's Super Bowl. Although both the NFL and Robey-Coleman admitted that a penalty should have been called, league commissioner Roger Goodell determined that the no-call was an act of human error by the referees and not enough to reverse the game's outcome. The Rams subsequently lost Super Bowl LIII to the New England Patriots, who also defeated them in their previous appearance. Following the controversy, the NFL instituted a new rule for the 2019 season that would allow coaches to challenge pass interference calls. Challengable pass interference calls, however, would not be retained after the season.

Background
The 2018 regular seasons saw both the Saints and the Rams improve upon 11–5 records to both go 13–3. The two teams won their respective divisions for the second year in a row. In the 2017 playoffs, the Saints defeated divisional rival Carolina Panthers in the Wild Card Round before falling to the Minnesota Vikings in the Divisional Round after the Vikings scored a last-second touchdown that would become known as the Minneapolis Miracle. The Rams had fallen to the Atlanta Falcons in the Wild Card Round.

In the 2018 season, the Saints and Rams respectively secured the 1 and 2 seeds, ensuring they would get a first-round bye and play in the NFC Divisional Round. During the regular season the Rams started the season with an unblemished 8-0 record going into their week 9 matchup with the Saints who began the year 7-1. The Saints pulled out to a large 18 point lead by halftime with Michael Thomas managing 211 receiving yards during the game. The Rams fought hard but Jared Goff soon found himself unable to convert on back to back drives with one critical interception during the 3rd quarter. Infamously during a critical play in the 4th quarter; Thomas had imitated Joe Horn’s notorious cellphone celebration upon a large touchdown in a very public effort to taunt the Rams as New Orleans had ultimately secured the lead, and ended the Rams’ streak. The celebration led to Thomas being fined $30,000 for excessive celebration and multiple Rams players expressed their anger with Thomas’ on-field antics during the loss. In addition to Sean Payton’s statements encouraging the gesture; Rams’ then-cornerback Marcus Peters made a retaliatory public insult against Payton’s comments by claiming: "Tell Sean Payton to keep talking that shit," he said. "We're going to see him soon, you feel me? Because I like what he was saying on the sidelines, too. So tell him to keep talking that shit, and I hope you see me soon. We're going to have a nice little bowl of gumbo together."

The Saints managed to hold onto the 1 seed following Week 15 after the Rams lost back to back games in which they fell 6-15 against the Chicago Bears on the road, and the next week would go onto fall 23-30 to the Eagles at home in an upset loss.

In the Divisional Round, the Saints played the sixth-seeded and defending Super Bowl champion Philadelphia Eagles. Although they fell behind 14–0 in the first quarter after Eagles quarterback Nick Foles scored two touchdowns, the Saints scored 20 unanswered points to win the game, with cornerback Marshon Lattimore intercepting Nick Foles in Saints territory on the Eagles' final drive. It was the Saints' first NFC Championship game appearance since the 2009 season, when they won Super Bowl XLIV. The Rams played the fourth-seeded Dallas Cowboys and defeated them by a score of 30–22 as running backs C. J. Anderson and Todd Gurley each rushed for over 100 yards and combined for three touchdowns. It was the Rams' first NFC championship appearance since the 2001 season, when they were the St. Louis Rams and advanced to Super Bowl XXXVI, where they lost to the New England Patriots.

Game summary

After a Saints field goal, Rams quarterback Jared Goff was intercepted by Saints linebacker Demario Davis at Los Angeles' 17 yard line. The Saints kicked another field goal, and the Rams failed to get a first down again and were forced to punt. The Saints marched 63 yards down the field and scored a touchdown, making the score 13–0 at the end of the first quarter. The Rams scored a field goal halfway through the second quarter. After two punts by the Saints and one by the Rams, the Rams scored a touchdown on a 6 yard Todd Gurley run, cutting the lead to 3 points at the end of the half.

In the second half, the Rams started with a punt. The two teams then traded touchdowns, making the score 20–17 in favor of the Saints. In the fourth quarter, the Rams drove inside the Saints’ red zone, but the refs missed a flagrant face masking call which would have given the Rams first and goal on the one; a probable touchdown would have given the Rams a 4-point lead and require a Saints touchdown on their subsequent and final drive for the win.  Instead, they had to settle for a field goal to tie the game with 5:03 remaining.

Controversial play

Prior to the controversial play, the game was tied 20–20. The Saints offense had stalled inside the red-zone at the Rams 13-yard line. The play occurred on 3rd down with 10 yards to go for a first down. Had the Saints picked up that first down, they could have run down the clock to under 20 seconds before attempting a field goal, and likely would have punched their ticket to the Super Bowl. Had they failed to convert, they would have left the Rams with plenty of time to drive down the field with a chance to win the game.

The play occurred with 1:49 remaining in the 4th quarter. Joe Buck and Troy Aikman, the announcers on the Fox broadcast, had the following commentary:

The play began at 1:49, with quarterback Drew Brees taking the ball and dropping back to pass. Brees threw the ball toward the right sideline, intended for receiver Tommylee Lewis. Before Lewis could attempt to catch the ball, he was blindsided by Nickell Robey-Coleman around the 6 yard line, knocking Lewis to the ground. No flag was thrown. Three officials had a clear view of the play: down judge Patrick Turner and side judge Gary Cavaletto, who were stationed 25 yards apart on the right sideline in front of the Saints bench, and back judge Todd Prukop, who was positioned in the middle of the field.

Saints head coach Sean Payton was enraged and appealed to the officials for a call, but to no avail. The controversial play appeared to be a violation of three rules from the NFL Rulebook. Rule 8.5.2(a) states that "contact by a player who is not playing the ball that restricts the opponent's opportunity to make the catch" is prohibited. Rule 8.5.2(e) prohibits players from "cutting off the path of an opponent by making contact with him, without playing the ball". Rule 12.2.9(b) states that "forcibly hitting the defenseless player’s head or neck area with the helmet, facemask, forearm, or shoulder, even if the initial contact is lower than the player’s neck, and regardless of whether the defensive player also uses his arms to tackle the defenseless player by encircling or grasping him" is prohibited. Immediately after the play, Robey-Coleman can be seen looking side-to-side, likely anticipating a penalty flag. He stated after the game that he got away with a penalty, telling reporters "Hell yeah, that was a PI. I did my part. Referee made the call. We respect it." Robey-Coleman was also reported as stating that he was intentionally committing a penalty to prevent a touchdown. Lewis, too, was looking for a flag. After the game, he stated "I got up looking for a flag and didn't see one. It was a bad call." Had the penalty been called, the Saints would have been granted a first down on the Rams six yard line with 1:45 left in the game. The Rams had only one timeout left, meaning the Saints likely could have run the clock down to about 10–15 seconds and attempted a short field goal to take the lead. The Saints' win probability was calculated at 98% if pass interference had been called. After the non-call, their win probability dropped to 78%.

Remainder of fourth quarter
Although the Saints were unsuccessful in a crucial touchdown, they did manage a field goal to take the lead 23–20 with 1:41 remaining. The Rams put together a quick nine-play drive and kicked a 48-yard field goal with 15 seconds left in the game to tie the score. The Saints elected to kneel the ball, and send the game into overtime.

Overtime
The Saints won the overtime coin toss and elected to receive the opening kickoff. They picked up a quick 15 yards on a pass interference call, but the drive stalled. On 2nd and 16, just 1 minute into overtime, Brees was hit on the arm by Rams linebacker Dante Fowler while throwing deep and the ball was intercepted by John Johnson. On the ensuing drive, the Rams drove down the field and Greg Zuerlein kicked the 57-yard game-winning field goal, sending the team to the Super Bowl.

Media coverage
The game received a 27.1 rating and a market share of 49 for television viewing in the US.

Aftermath
The win advanced the Rams to Super Bowl LIII, in which they were defeated by the New England Patriots, 13–3. Saints head coach Sean Payton, who had reacted demonstrably to the non-call on the sideline during the game, delivered strong remarks in his postgame press conference:

"Disappointing way to lose a game...frustrating, you know. Just getting off the phone with the league office. They blew the call. We had a lot of opportunities though, but that call puts it first and ten, we only need three plays, it's a game changing call. That's where it's at".

Payton references a phone call he held directly after the game with the NFL's Senior VP of Officiating, Al Riveron, who admitted the officials had missed the call. Five days after the game, the NFL fined Robey-Coleman $26,739 for the play. A fine issued on a play where no penalty was called is the League's informal post hoc penalty for plays that likely should have been flagged. The fine was an admission that not only was the play a defensive pass interference violation, but it also should have been called a personal foul for an illegal hit on a defenseless receiver. Payton and Saints players, including Brees, receiver Michael Thomas, and tight end Benjamin Watson, grew restless as Goodell was slow to reach out to players who felt like they were owed an explanation, or at least an admission that they had been wronged. Eleven days after the game, Thomas tweeted "He ain't talk to us". The next day, Brees was interviewed on The Dan Patrick Show:

"Do I really want to be in a position talking about this over and over again? No, but I have to stand up and do it because I have to represent my team, represent the Who Dat Nation, and that's my responsibility. It's the commissioner's responsibility to do the same thing, and yet we don't hear a peep for 10 days, and it's because he has to do it now because he's at the Super Bowl and he does his annual press conference".

In Goodell's annual Super Bowl interview on January 30, he admitted that officials were "human," but they had missed that call. While his answer did little to quell players' frustrations, it certainly did nothing for Saints fans, who effectively boycotted the Super Bowl. The game received a 26.1 television rating in New Orleans, the lowest of any market and by far the lowest ever in New Orleans. The general ratings were also the lowest in a decade, with average viewership at about 98 million and total viewership reported as 149 million.

Legal action 
A group of Saints fans and season ticket holders upset with the controversial non-call and the subsequent outcome of the game filed a lawsuit against the NFL on January 27, 2019. The lawsuit, filed by Tommy Badeaux and Candis Lambert "individually and on behalf of New Orleans Saints Season Ticket Holders, New Orleans Saints National Fan Base a/k/a The Who Dat Nation and any party with interest that has been affected by the outcome," named Roger Goodell and the NFL as defendants. The lawsuit asked the Louisiana Court "to mandate the extraordinary step of ordering a replay of the NFC Championship Game, and for damages to all putative class member Saints fans. The consequences of ordering a replay of the NFC Championship Game or any portion of the game cannot be overstated". Such an order would have been the first in history. The next day, the NFL publicly acknowledged the missed call for the first time. In the same press release, they asked that the lawsuit be thrown out on the grounds that "this kind of dispute implicates no legally cognizable rights". The court denied the plaintiffs request to replay the game days later. There was also petition on Change.org made requesting that Goodell declare a rematch between the Rams and the Saints on January 27, the Sunday before the Super Bowl. A total of 760,512 people signed the petition, but no such action was taken.

Rule change 
On January 30, 2019, reports began to surface that the NFL was considering a rule change. Goodell said during his Super Bowl interview that the league would re-examine replay rules, specifically those excluding judgment calls from being reviewable. Further reports indicated that the NFL is considering adopting a rule that would allow a limited basis for coaches to challenge judgment calls, or whether or not a penalty had been called. The rule would include a consequence should the call be upheld.

In March 2019, the NFL proposed a rule for a one-year replay expansion trial. Under the proposed rule, penalties and pass interference calls would be reviewable. On March 27, 2019, NFL owners approved a trial rule change that would allow coaches to challenge pass interference call on both the offense and the defense. The measure was approved by vote of 31–1, with the Cincinnati Bengals being the only team vote against it.  However, this rule change was reverted prior to the  season.

2019 incidents
The  season brought about a highly anticipated rematch between, the Saints and Rams in Los Angeles. However; this game also encountered its share of controversy. The game was tied 3–3 with 6:11 left in the 2nd quarter. The Rams were at the Saints' 11 yard line, 3rd and 7. As quarterback Jared Goff attempted a pass, Trey Hendrickson stripped the ball from his hand and Cameron Jordan returned it 87 yards for a touchdown. However, the officials called it an incomplete pass. After review, the ruling was changed to a fumble. The officials did not credit Jordan with the touchdown, however, stating that the play had already been blown dead, consistent with league rules. Despite the controversial decision of the officials in the rematch, the Rams went on to beat the Saints 27-9. The Saints were forced to bring in backup quarterback Teddy Bridgewater halfway through the game due to Drew Brees suffering an injury to his hand after being hit by Aaron Donald. Saints Head coach Sean Payton said after the game that "When we get poor officiating or we get an awful call like that, we can't control that." Cam Jordan directed a jab at the referees, saying, "I didn't even hear the whistle. I grabbed the ball, 15, 20 yards down the field. Allegedly a whistle was blown— clearly, I mean, a whistle was blown. Normally you let the play happen. Any Foot Locker — I mean, referee — usually tells you, you let the play happen, then you go back and review the play."

During the Saints' wild card playoff game, they saw their season end due to another controversial pass interference no-call against the Minnesota Vikings. The Vikings won the game on a touchdown pass on the opening drive in overtime from Kirk Cousins to Kyle Rudolph, 26–20. However, the Saints allege that Rudolph pushed off on Saints cornerback P. J. Williams to gain separation in order to catch the pass and no penalty was called. Had offensive pass interference been called, the Vikings would have faced 3rd and goal from the 14 and the Saints would have had a chance to force a field goal to stay in the game.

Box score

Personnel

Starting lineups

Officials
Officials adapted from official NFL game summary.
Referee: Bill Vinovich (#52) 
Umpire: Bruce Stritesky (#102)
Down Judge: Patrick Turner (#13)
Line Judge: Rusty Baynes (#59)
Field Judge: Tom Hill (#97)
Side Judge:  Gary Cavaletto (#60)
Back Judge: Todd Prukop (#30)
Replay Official: Mike Wimmer (#0)

See also
 Bottlegate
 Fail Mary — another controversial officiating decision from 
 Pass interference

References

External links 
 Rams vs. Saints NFC Championship Game Highlights (via the NFL's official YouTube channel)

National Football League controversies
National Football League playoff games
2018 controversies in the United States
2018 National Football League season
Los Angeles Rams postseason
New Orleans Saints postseason
NFC Championship Games
January 2019 sports events in the United States
2019 in sports in Louisiana